The Los Angeles Film Critics Association Award for Best Supporting Performance is an award given annually by the Los Angeles Film Critics Association. It was first introduced in 2022, after it was announced that the four acting categories would be retired and replaced with two gender neutral categories, with both Best Supporting Actor and Best Supporting Actress merging into the Best Supporting Performance category.

Winners
 † = Winner of the Academy Award for Best Supporting Actor or Best Supporting Actress
 ‡ = Nominated for the Academy Award for Best Supporting Actor or Best Supporting Actress

2020s

See also
 National Board of Review Award for Best Supporting Actor
 National Board of Review Award for Best Supporting Actress
 National Society of Film Critics Award for Best Supporting Actor
 National Society of Film Critics Award for Best Supporting Actress
 New York Film Critics Circle Award for Best Supporting Actor
 New York Film Critics Circle Award for Best Supporting Actress

References

S
Film awards for supporting actor
Film awards for supporting actress